Anthology is a compilation album by New Zealand singer-songwriter and multi-instrumentalist Bic Runga. The album was initially set to be released on 23 November 2012, but ultimately released on 1 December 2012 in New Zealand. The album cover was revealed on 29 October 2012.

Reception
Lydia Jenkin from The Herald NZ gave the album 3.5 out of 5 saying; "It's a curious 22-track collection – the inclusion of very early songs remind that Runga was once a youthful, idealistic young girl with a guitar sitting in her bedroom, but they don't showcase the best of her talents. The fact that tracks from her first two albums take up more than half the album, while her strongest releases – Birds and Belle – only get seven tracks between them, heightens the sense that though it's certainly reflective of Runga's whole career, Anthology is not truly a "best of""

Track listing
 CD/ DD (Sony Music – 88765418492)
 "Get Some Sleep" – 3:34
 "Sway" – 4:23
 "Listening for the Weather" – 3:29
 "Good Morning Baby"  (with Dan Wilson)  – 3:29
 "Something Good" – 3:18
 "Roll into One" – 3:19
 "Drive" – 2:46
 "Bursting Through" – 3:42
 "Say After Me" – 4:35
 "Winning Arrow" – 2:52
 "Hello Hello" – 3:04
 "Suddenly Strange" – 4:18
 "Tiny Little Piece of My Heart" – 2:15
 "Gravity" – 3:39
 "Ne me quitte pas"  (live with Christchurch Symphony Orchestra)  – 4:06
 "One More Cup of Coffee"  (live with Christchurch Symphony Orchestra)  – 3:50
 "Everything is Beautiful and New" – 2:57
 "Something's Gotten Hold of My Heart" – 3:45
 "Precious Things"  (live) (with Tim Finn and Dave Dobbyn)  – 4:24
 "If You Really Do" – 3:53
 "Birds" – 3:45
 "The Be All and End All" – 3:23

Weekly charts

References

2012 greatest hits albums
Bic Runga albums